Nasa Puqi (Aymara nasa nose, puqi crumb, "nose crumb", also spelled Nasa Poke) is a  mountain in the Andes in Bolivia. It is located in the Chilla-Kimsa Chata mountain range south-east of Wiñaymarka Lake, the southern part of Lake Titicaca. It lies in the La Paz Department, Ingavi Province, Tiwanaku Municipality. Nasa Puqi is situated north of the mountains Chuqi Ch'iwani and Kimsa Chata.

See also
 Tiwanaku River

References 

Mountains of La Paz Department (Bolivia)